Kobe Andre Hernandez-Foster (born June 26, 2002) is an American soccer player who plays for HamKam. Besides the United States, he has played in Germany for VfL Wolfsburg in the German Bundesliga.

Club career 
Hernandez-Foster joined LA Galaxy's academy in 2016 and appeared for Galaxy's USL side LA Galaxy II as an injury-time substitute during a 3–1 loss to OKC Energy on September 12, 2018.

On July 13, 2020, it was announced that Hernandez-Foster, along with fellow United States youth national teamer Bryang Kayo, signed with VfL Wolfsburg of the German Bundesliga. It was announced that Hernandez-Foster would begin playing with the club's U-19 team.

Herdanez trained with Norwegian club HamKam during the autumn of 2021, but was not signed due to the team having a foreign player limit. After the team secured promotion to Eliteserien they signed him on a two year deal on November 4, 2021.

International career 
In October 2019, he was named to the United States squad for the 2019 FIFA U-17 World Cup in Brazil.

Honors
Individual
 CONCACAF U-17 Championship Best XI: 2019

References

External links

2002 births
Living people
Soccer players from Los Angeles
American soccer players
United States men's youth international soccer players
Association football forwards
LA Galaxy II players
VfL Wolfsburg players
Hamarkameratene players
USL Championship players
American expatriate soccer players
American expatriate soccer players in Germany
American expatriate sportspeople in Norway
Expatriate footballers in Norway